Proriv, officially the People's Democratic Party "Proriv!", was a political youth movement and political party in Transnistria whose methods were supposedly modelled on pro-Western organizations Otpor!, Kmara and other participants of colour revolutions in the post-Soviet states.

History 
Proriv was originally founded in 2005 as a division of the pro-Russian political youth organization Proriv. A year later, on 2 June 2006, the Transnistrian branch of Proriv was registered as a political party. It used yellow as its political color, and the famous black-and-white photo of communist guerrilla fighter Che Guevara (Guerrillero Heroico) as a symbol. It was associated with the "Che Guevara High School for Political Leadership" in Tiraspol, which was established to provide training for young political activists. The organization supported the continuation of the republic's independence which was declared on 2 September 1990, and rejected any talk of potential reunification with Moldova.

Proriv's head was Dmitry Soin, a sociologist and former officer of the Transnistrian ministry of state security, who is wanted by Interpol. Roman Konoplev, a Russian strategist and publicist, took part in formulating ideological documents of the party. The youth movement had a mostly Slav female leadership, with Alena Arshinova at its head.

The party was dissolved by authorities in November 2012 after the Supreme Court of Transnistria ordered its liquidation. Members of Proriv denounced the decision as political repression.

Electoral results

Parliamentary

Presidential

References

External links 
 Official website
 Weapons Smuggling And Youth Cults In The Country That Doesn't Exist (VICE News)

Political parties in Transnistria
Banned political parties